Sir Joshua Peter Bell K.C.M.G. (19 January 1827 – 20 December 1881) was a  pastoralist and parliamentarian from Queensland, Australia. His eldest son was barrister and parliamentarian Joshua Thomas Bell.

Early life

Bell was born in Kildare, Ireland, eldest son of Thomas Bell and his wife Sarah, née Alexander. The family emigrated to Australia around 1830. He attended the Sydney College and King's School, Parramatta. In 1848, Bell became joint manager of Jimbour Station in Darling Downs, Queensland with his brother Alexander after his father had taken over the lease of the property. Bell soon assumed sole control of the station due to his astute management that saw the station becoming one of the most respected in the area.

Parliamentary career

Early parliamentary career

Due to his status as a prominent landholder, Bell was invited to stand in the elections in 1862 for the seat of West Moreton. He won this seat with a considerable majority and remained in office for six years. In 1868 he stood for the seat of Northern Downs (Dalby), the local constituency of Jimbour Station, in the Legislative Assembly of Queensland. He was successful in this election and continued to hold the seat for eleven years.

Ministerial career

In his eleven years in parliament in the seat of Northern Downs, Bell gained a number of ministerial roles. In 1864 he was appointed treasurer (in the first Queensland ministry under Robert Herbert) a position he held until 1866. In 1866 there was a financial crisis owing to the failure of two banks, Bell as treasurer stated that he intended to issue "inconvertible government notes". The governor, Sir George Bowen, considered that would be an infringement of the prerogatives of the crown and then premier Arthur Macalister resigned on 20 July 1866. Bell later assumed the role of treasurer in a subsequent government in 1871 and remained in office for further three years. Bell also held a number of other ministerial positions, notably Minister for Lands in 1866 and acting Minister for Works in 1867.

Further career

In 1879 Bell transferred to the Queensland Legislative Council and was elected president. For a short period of time from March to November 1880, Bell was appointed as Administrator in the absence of the then Governor Sir Arthur Kennedy. He was appointed K.C.M.G. in 1881.

Later life

Joshua Peter Bell died suddenly on 20 December 1881 and was buried at Toowong Cemetery. A memorial to him was also erected at Jimbour Homestead.

Legacy
The town of Bell was named after him.

References

Further reading
 Extracts from a 1971 interview with Harry Darlow, Wakka Wakka stockman, about his time on Jimbour Station, in which he mentions Joshua Bell.

1827 births
1881 deaths
Members of the Queensland Legislative Assembly
Irish emigrants to colonial Australia
Members of the Queensland Legislative Council
Presidents of the Queensland Legislative Council
Treasurers of Queensland
Burials at Toowong Cemetery
19th-century Australian politicians
Pre-Separation Queensland